The Osukuru Thermal Power Station is a planned  chemical-fired thermal power plant  in Uganda.

Location

Overview
The power station is a planned joint project by the government of Uganda and the Chinese Guangzhou Dongsong Energy Group. The station would be part of a US$620 million development known as the Osukuru Industrial Complex. The plant primarily would use excess heat generated during the chemical processes in the manufacturing complex to heat either steam or compressed air, which would turn the turbines and generate the electricity. Construction of the industrial complex commenced in October 2015.

See also

List of power stations in Uganda

References

External links
Investing in the electricity sector in Uganda

Power stations in Uganda
Proposed power stations in Uganda
Tororo District